This is an alphabetical list of bluegrass musicians.
For bands, see the List of bluegrass bands.



A
Tom Adams
Eddie Adcock
David "Stringbean" Akeman
Red Allen
Darol Anger
Mike Auldridge

B
Kenny Baker
Jessie Baker
Butch Baldassari
Russ Barenberg
Byron Berline
Carroll Best
Norman Blake
Kathy Boyd
Dale Ann Bradley
David Bromberg
Herman Brock Jr
Jesse Brock
Alison Brown
Buckethead
Buzz Busby
Roger Bush
Sam Bush

C
Ann Marie Calhoun
Jason Carter
Vassar Clements
Michael Cleveland 
Bill Clifton
Charlie Cline
Curly Ray Cline
Mike Compton
John Byrne Cooke
J. P. Cormier
John Cowan
Dan Crary
J. D. Crowe

D
Jamie Dailey
Charlie Daniels
Vernon Derrick
Hazel Dickens
Doug Dillard
The Dillards
Jerry Douglas
Casey Driessen
John Duffey
Stuart Duncan

E
Chris Eldridge
Bill Emerson
Bill Evans

F
Lester Flatt
Dennis Fetchet
Pete Fidler
Béla Fleck
Sally Ann Forrester
Tony Furtado
Raymond Fairchild

G
Jerry Garcia
Josh Graves
Vince Gill
Brennan Gilmore
Johnny Gimble
Rhiannon Giddens
Richard Greene
Clinton Gregory
David Grier
Andy Griffith
David Grisman

H
Jamie Hartford
John Hartford
Aubrey Haynie
John Herald
Bobby Hicks
Chris Hillman
Scott Holstein
Sierra Hull

I
Rob Ickes
IIIrd Tyme Out

J
Jana Jae
Sarah Jarosz
Mitchell F. Jayne (Mitch Jayne)

K
Michael Kang
Kaia Kater
Larry Keel
Leslie Keith
Irene Kelley
Danny Knicely
Kenny Kosek
Alison Krauss
Gundula Krause
Robert Křesťan

L
Shawn Lane
Jim Lauderdale
Bernie Leadon
Doyle Lawson
Kate Lee
Ray Legere
Laurie Lewis
Benjamin F. Logan
Patty Loveless
Andy Leftwich
Claire Lynch

M
Mack Magaha
Benny Martin
Jimmy Martin
Mac Martin
Steve Martin 
Bessie Lee Mauldin
Del McCoury
Jesse McReynolds
Jim McReynolds
Edgar Meyer
Charlie Monroe
Bill Monroe
Marcus Mumford
Alan Munde

N
Penny Nichols
Alecia Nugent

O
Tim O'Brien
Mark O'Connor

P
Dolly Parton
Todd Phillips
Danny Paisley

R 

Missy Raines
Tommy Ramone
David Rawlings
Don Reno
Tony Rice
Alwyn Robinson
Peter Rowan
Gary Ruley

S
Josh Shilling
Earl Scruggs
Ricky Skaggs
Arthur Lee "Red" Smiley
Arthur "Guitar Boogie" Smith
Ruby Jane Smith
Johnny Staats
Carter Stanley
Ralph Stanley
Chris Stapleton
Andy Statman
Larry Stephenson
Billy Strings
Marty Stuart
Eddie Stubbs
Bryan Sutton

T
Gordon Terry
Chris Thile
Tony Trischka
Josh Turner
Molly Tuttle
Dan Tyminski

U
Donna Ulisse

V
Jim Van Cleve
Dailey & Vincent
Rhonda Vincent

W
Charlie Waller
Sara Watkins
Doc Watson
Eric Weissberg
Dean Webb 
Gillian Welch
Clarence White
Roland White
Keith Whitley
Benny Williams
"Big" Paul Williams
Vern Williams
Chubby Wise
Mac Wiseman
Buddy Woodward
Gene Wooten

Y
Rex Yetman

See also
Bluegrass music
Country music
List of country music performers

References

 

Bluegrass